Green left is an ideology which combines environmentalism, feminism, socialism, and pacifism.

Green Left or Left Green may also refer to:

Political parties
 GreenLeft in the Netherlands
 Green–Left Coalition, in Croatia
 Green Left (Denmark), also known as the Socialist People's Party
 Green Left (England and Wales), a faction in the Green Party of England and Wales
 Green Left (Hungary)
 Green Left Party, in Turkey
 Left-Green Movement, in Iceland

Federations of parties
 Federation of The Greens–Green Left, founded in Spain in 1999
 Nordic green left, a brand of socialism in Nordic countries that incorporates environmentalism and feminism

Other uses
 Green Left (Australian newspaper), an Australian newspaper